Pradeep Kumar Singh is an Indian Politician from Uttar Pradesh. He is a Member of the Uttar Pradesh Legislative Assembly since 10 March 2022 from Sadabad representing Rashtriya Lok Dal.

References 

Living people
Rashtriya Lok Dal politicians
People from Hathras district
Uttar Pradesh MLAs 2022–2027
Year of birth missing (living people)